Pura is the given name of:

 Pura Belpré (1899–1982), first Puerto Rican librarian in New York City
 Pura Fé, Native American singer, songwriter, musician, poet, artist, dancer, teacher and social activist
 Pura Lopez (born 1962), Spanish shoe designer
 Pura López Colomé (born 1952), Mexican poet, translator
 Pura Santillan-Castrence (1905—2007), Filipino writer and diplomat